The 1966 Maine gubernatorial election took place on November 8, 1966. Incumbent Republican Governor John Reed, had been elected to finish the term of Clinton Clauson in 1960, was then re-elected in 1962 and became the state's first four-year Governor.  Reed was seeking a second full four-year term, and was challenged by Democrat Kenneth M. Curtis, having defeated James Erwin for the Republican nomination.  Curtis defeated Reed, beginning a twenty-year period of Republican isolation from the Blaine House.

This was the last gubernatorial election in Maine in which a non-incumbent candidate won with a majority of the vote, until Janet Mills won with 50.8% of the vote in 2018. As of 2022, Reed is the most recent incumbent governor to lose re-election; all succeeding Governors have been re-elected, with the exception of James B. Longley, who did not run for re-election in 1978, holding himself to a one-term promise.

Results

Notes

1966
Maine
Gubernatorial
November 1966 events in the United States